
Belgium and France have a long tradition in comics and comic books (bandes dessinées) with some shared history in comics  and publishing houses.

History
The first important publishers of bandes dessinées started producing comics magazines and books in the 1930s and 1940s, especially in Belgium, with Casterman, Dargaud, Dupuis and Le Lombard as the most famous ones.

From the 1970s and the "adult" turn of the comics, new publishing houses rose, especially in France, like Les Humanoïdes Associés, Glénat and Delcourt.

In the 1990s, several new small independent publishers emerged, such as l'Association, Amok, and Fréon. While some of these new publishers gained popular success and succeeded in creating a new look in their comics, others kept a more intransigent approach. In recent decades, many independent publishers have been restructured. While keeping their brand names, most of them have been bought, included or gathered in larger conglomerates, such as Média-Participations.

Non-exhaustive list of notable Franco-Belgian publishers
12 bis
Actes Sud
Albin-Michel 
Ankama 
L'Association
Bamboo Édition

Casterman 
Dargaud
Delcourt
Le Dernier Cri
Dupuis
Ego comme X
Fluide Glacial
Frémok and its predecessors Amok and Fréon
Futuropolis
Glénat 
Les Humanoïdes Associés
Éditions Joker
Le Lombard
Lug
Mosquito
Les Requins-Marteaux
Semic
Soleil
Standaard Uitgeverij
Vents d'Ouest

See also
French Manga publishers
List of Franco-Belgian comic series

Notes

Publishing houses
Publishing houses